Lafayette Township is one of five townships in Floyd County, Indiana. As of the 2010 census, its population was 7,449 and it contained 2,856 housing units, although it remains one of the two townships in the county without an incorporated community.

Geography
State Senate District 46, US Congress District 9, State Representative District 72, Indiana Department of Homeland Security District 9.

Unincorporated communities
 Floyds Knobs
 Mount St. Francis
 Saint Marys
 Scottsville

Adjacent townships
 Carr Township, Clark County (northeast)
 New Albany Township (southeast)
 Georgetown Township (southwest)
 Greenville Township (west)
 Wood Township, Clark County (northwest)

Major highways
 Interstate 64
 U.S. Route 150

References
 
 United States Census Bureau cartographic boundary files

External links
 Indiana Township Association
 United Township Association of Indiana

Townships in Floyd County, Indiana
Townships in Indiana